The  is a Japanese dual-voltage (1,500 V DC and 20 kV AC 50 Hz) electric multiple unit (EMU) train type introduced by Japanese National Railways (JNR) on express services in 1965 and later operated by East Japan Railway Company (JR East), West Japan Railway Company (JR-West), and Kyushu Railway Company (JR Kyushu).

The last sets operated by JR-West were withdrawn in 2015. However, 2 cars remain in service as the driving car of a mixed 413/455 series set until they resold to the private railway operator in 2021 hence ended their overall service by JR West.

Design
Intended for use in the Tohoku region, the basic design and appearance was identical to the 475 series dual-voltage (1,500 V DC and 20 kV AC 60 Hz) EMUs introduced around the same time in Kyushu, and similar to the earlier 453 and 473 series EMUs. The first units built were not equipped with air-conditioning, except for the SaRo 455 "Green" (first class) cars.

Variants
 455-0 series
 455-200 series
 455-300 series
 455-400 series
 455-500 series
 455-600 series
 455-700 series

455-0 series
These were the 455 series cars built from new between 1965 and 1971.
 KuHa 455-1 – 75, driving trailer cars
 KuMoHa 455-1 – 51, driving motor cars
 KuRoHa 455-1, composite driving trailer converted from KuHa 455-44 with three rows of "Green" (first class) seats
 MoHa 454-1 – 51, intermediate motor cars, with pantograph
 SaHa 455-1 – 8, intermediate trailer cars (built for use in 457 series sets)
 SaRo 455-1 – 45, "Green" (first class) trailer cars
 SaHaShi 455-1 – 26, buffet cars

With the reduction in express services and gradual reassignment of 455 series sets to local services, a number of cab cars were subsequently rebuilt from intermediate cars or other EMU types from 1975 to allow shorter sets to be formed.

455-200 series
 KuHa 455-201: Rebuilt in 1975 from SaHaShi 455-18 buffet car
 KuHa 455-202 – 203: Rebuilt in 1979 from 451 series EMU driving cars KuHa 451-26 and 27

455-300 series
 KuHa 455-301 – 320: Rebuilt in 1984 from 165 series EMU KuHa 165 driving cars.
 KuHa 455-321 – 324: Rebuilt 1984-1985 from 169 series EMU KuHa 169-900 driving cars.

455-400 series
 KuHa 455-401: Rebuilt in 1984 from 165 series EMU KuMoHa 165 driving car.
 KuHa 455-402 – 405: Rebuilt 1984-1985 from 169 series EMU KuMoHa 169-900 driving cars.

455-500 series
 KuHa 455-501 – 505: Rebuilt in 1983 from 165 series EMU SaHa 165 intermediate trailer cars.

455-600 series
 KuHa 455-601 – 605: Rebuilt in 1984 from 455 series EMU SaRo 455 intermediate "Green" trailer cars.
 KuHa 455-606 – 611: Rebuilt from 165 series EMU SaRo 165 intermediate "Green" trailer cars.

455-700 series
 KuHa 455-701 – 702: Rebuilt in 1986 and 1987 from 455 series EMU SaHa 455 intermediate trailer cars.

Formations
As of 1 October 2019, JR-West operates 2 KuHa 455-700 cars. These cars are included in mixed 413/455 series three-car sets based at Kanazawa Depot and used on the Nanao Line. They are formed as shown below.

 The MoHa 412 car is fitted with one PS21 lozenge-type pantograph.
 Set B11 includes 413-100 series cars KuMoHa 413-101 and MoHa 412-101.

Past formations
As of October 1 2013, JR-West operated 16 KuHa 455 cars (including two KuHa 455-700 cars), included in mixed 413/455 and 475/455 series three-car sets based at Kanazawa Depot and used on the Hokuriku Main Line. They were formed as shown below.

413 series sets B04 and B11

In March 2013, these sets were reallocated to the Nanao Line.

475 series sets A05 and A26

 The MoHa 474 car is fitted with one PS21 lozenge-type pantograph.

A typical formation for a combined Bandai (455 series, cars 1 to 6, Ueno - Kitakata) and Iwate (451/453 series, cars 7 to 13, Ueno - Morioka) service as of March 1972 is shown below.

JR East 3-car sets (S2 to S51) based at Sendai Depot and used in the Tohoku region until their withdrawal in 2008 were formed as shown below.

 The MoHa 454 car was fitted with one PS16 lozenge-type pantograph.

One JR East 3-car set, S40, based at Sendai Depot, was modified in 1999 with a KuRoHa 455 car at the north end including three rows of "Green" car (first class) accommodation arranged 2+2 abreast.

 The MoHa 454 car was fitted with one PS16 lozenge-type pantograph.

Key
 KuHa: Standard class driving trailer car
 KuMoHa: Standard class driving motor car
 MoHa: Intermediate motor car
 SaRo: "Green" (first class) trailer car
 SaHaShi: Buffet car

Interior
Designed for use on express services, passenger accommodation consisted of fixed 4-person seating bays.

Liveries

History

From 1 July 1967, 455 series trains were introduced on new Bandai express services operating on the Banetsu West Line.

From the late 1960s, JNR was beginning to install air-conditioning on its trains, and 455 series cars built from June 1968 were designed to allow air-conditioning to be added easily at a later date. Air-conditioning was subsequently retrofitted between 1969 and 1975.

With the opening of the Tohoku Shinkansen, the number of express services in the region were cut back from the start of the 15 November 1982 timetable revision, and discontinued by March 1985. JR East 455 series sets were reassigned to local services, and withdrawn by 2008.

Preserved examples

As of 2012, three 455 series EMU cars are preserved, all at the Railway Museum in Saitama Prefecture.
 KuMoHa 455-1 (restored in original JNR express livery)
 KuHa 455-2 (in cream/green livery, used as a rest area)
 MoHa 454-4 (in cream/green livery, used as a rest area)

References

Electric multiple units of Japan
East Japan Railway Company
Kyushu Railway Company
West Japan Railway Company
Vehicles introduced in 1965

ja:国鉄457系電車#455系・475系
1500 V DC multiple units of Japan
20 kV AC multiple units